Frank Rafael Rainieri Marranzini is a Dominican businessman in the tourist industry in the Dominican Republic. He is the chairman and founder of Grupo Puntacana. According to Forbes, Rainieri has one of the ten largest fortunes in the Dominican Republic, with a net worth near the billion-dollar mark as of 2014. In 2015, he was designated ambassador of the Sovereign Military Order of Malta to the Dominican Republic, a position that his father also held four decades earlier.

Early life
Rainieri was born into a family with tradition of hospitality. His paternal grandparents, Isidoro Rainieri and Bianca Franceschini, migrated from Bologna, northern Italy, to northern Dominican Republic, and established two hotels, one in Puerto Plata and the other in Santiago; they had more than 10 children. His parents were Francisco Rainieri Franceschini and Venecia Marranzini Lepore (daughter of the Italian immigrants Orazio Michelo Marranzini Inginio and Inmaccolatta Lepore Rodia, who migrated as children with their respective families, all of them natives of Santa Lucia di Serino, in southern Italy).

He went to college in Philadelphia at Saint Joseph's College, now Saint Joseph's University., finalizing them at APEC University, in Santo Domingo.

Punta Cana

In 1969, Rainieri and Theodore Kheel acquired a 58-million square meter lot on the eastern end of the Dominican Republic, which was covered with jungle and six miles of beach. Their first project was a 40 guest hotel called the Punta Cana Club, inaugurated two years later. In 1979, they constructed the Puntacana Hotel. The Punta Cana International Airport followed in 1984. In 1997, Rainieri and Kheel partnered with Oscar de la Renta and Julio Iglesias to start work on the Punta Cana Marina and the real estate development of the area.

Grupo Puntacana History 

 1969: Ted Kheel and group of 40 partners purchase approximately 30 square miles of undeveloped land in the eastern Dominican Republic.
 1970: Frank Rainieri (Dominican entrepreneur), Ted Kheel and partners began the development of the tourism project.
 1971: Puntacana Resort & Club (PCRC) builds first “resort” of 10 beach cottages and clubhouse, dedication attended by President Balaguer.
 1972: PCRC builds first elementary school in Punta Cana.
 1977: Club Mediterranee purchases parcel of land from Puntacana Resort & Club.
 1980: Club Med opens hotel in Punta Cana.
 1984: Inauguration of the Punta Cana International Airport with first flight from San Juan, Puerto Rico.
 1987: PCRC builds new Puntacana Resort & Club using thatch-roof constructions and low-impact sustainable architecture.
 1988: Formation of the not-for-profit Puntacana Ecological Foundation (FEPC) with donation of 1,500 acres of land for ecological park and reserve (incorporation follows in 1994).
 1992: Puntacana Ecological Foundation launches first sustainable agriculture initiative in Punta Cana (Fruit Tree Garden).
 1996: Puntacana Foundation organized the first Concert at the Basilica Nuestra Senora de la Altagracia in the town of Higüey performed by the National Symphony Orchestra and Choir.
 1997: Julio Iglesias and Oscar de la Renta join Kheel and Rainieri as PCRC major partners and build first homes in Corales development.
 1998: PCRC founds a second not-for-profit organization, Puntacana Foundation (FPC) to develop social and community programs in the region.
 2000: FPC founds bilingual, private school Puntacana International School (PCIS).
 2001: FEPC and PCRC create Puntacana Center for Sustainability to develop research and education programs that create solutions to the environmental and social challenges facing tourism industry.
 2004: Puntacana Foundation founds the public Ann and Ted Kheel Polytechnic School.
 2004: Puntacana Ecological Foundation launches Puntacana Partnership for Ecological Sustainable Coastal Areas (PESCA).
 2005: Puntacana Foundation makes its first commitment to the Clinton Global Initiative
 2005: Puntacana Foundation Launch of co-management of Rural Clinic of Veron.
 2005: Puntacana Foundation inaugurates the Puntacana Art Gallery jointly to Fundacion Igneri.
 2006: Puntacana Resort & Club becomes founding member of RENAEPA, the National Network for Businesses that Protect the Environment in the Dominican Republic, now known as ECORED.
 2006: Grupo Puntacana Foundation held the first medical mission together with Virginia College of Osteopathic Medicine (VCOM)
 2007: Grupo Puntacana becomes a member of the United Nations Global Compact.
 2007: Puntacana Ecological Foundation launches Zero Waste, integrated solid waste management system for Puntacana Resort & Club.
 2008: Puntacana Foundation build and equip a police station to the community of Verón
 2008: Puntacana Foundation launches “Carnaval de Punta Cana”.
 2009: Puntacana Ecological Foundation launches beekeeping and worm-composting projects.
 2009: FEPC signs collaborative agreement with The Peregrine Fund to conserve the endangered Ridgway's Hawk.
 2009: FEPC and FPC sign a collaborative agreement with Save the Children to develop community programs in the town of Veron.
 2010: Puntacana Foundation launches the Marine Archeological Project to locate and rescue archaeologically valuable pieces from the sea for exhibition.
 2011: Puntacana Foundation hold the first Visual Surgical Mission together with Instituto de Ciencias Visuales de España (Incivi) among other partners
 2012: PCRC and FEPC achieve Presidential Decree naming coastal area of Puntacana Resort & Club and Cap Cana as “Marine Protected Area.”
 2014: Puntacana Foundation launches the social program Grupo Puntacana Works with the Community.
 2014: Puntacana Foundation launches the Our lady of Punta Cana Craft Workshop
 2015: Puntacana Foundation launches the housing project Ciudad Caracolí.
 2016: Puntacana Ecological Foundation and Puntacana Foundation merge.
 2017: Foundation inaugurated the Oscar de la Renta Pediatric Center facilities. The center will provide primary health care to more than 15,000 disadvantaged children from local communities.
 2018: Creation of the Center of Marine Innovation.
 2019: Launch of terrestrial coral nurseries.
 2019: Launch of the Ornamental Fish Nursery Project.
 2019: Inauguration of the Centro Educativo Caracolí.

References 

Living people
1940s births
Date of birth missing (living people)
People from Puerto Plata, Dominican Republic
Saint Joseph's University alumni
Dominican Republic businesspeople
Dominican Republic billionaires
Order of Merit of Duarte, Sánchez and Mella
People of Campanian descent
People of Emilian descent
Ambassadors of the Sovereign Military Order of Malta to the Dominican Republic
White Dominicans